The 7th Frigate Squadron was an administrative unit of the Royal Navy from 1951 to 1993.

Operational history
During its existence, the squadron included , Type 41 and  frigates.

Ships from the squadron served with the Home Fleet, with the West Indies Squadron, participated in the Cod Wars, the Silver Jubilee Fleet Review, the Falklands War and as part of STANAVFORLANT.

Squadron commander

See also
 List of squadrons and flotillas of the Royal Navy

References

Frigate squadrons of the Royal Navy